The Diploma Bertha Lutz (Bertha Lutz Diploma), also known as the Prêmio Bertha Lutz (Bertha Lutz Prize), was established by the Federal Senate of Brazil to recognize women who have made contributions to the defense of women's rights and gender issues in Brazil. It is named in honor of the Brazilian biologist and feminist leader Bertha Lutz.

The award was established by a 2001 resolution, based on an initial 1998 draft resolution presented by Senator Emília Fernandes. It is given annually during a special session of the Federal Senate as part of events for International Women's Day on March 8. Government entities or nongovernmental organizations can nominate candidates for the Diploma, and the nominations pass through the Board of the Federal Senate. The winners are selected by the Diploma Bertha Luz Council, composed of one representative from each political party within the Senate. The award traditionally recognized five women from different areas of expertise, although that number has increased in recent years.

Honorees

2002 

 Luiza Erundina, federal deputy (PSB-SP);
 Maria Berenice Dias, judge in Rio Grande do Sul;
 Maria Isabel Lopes, municipal secretary of Fortaleza;
 Heleieth Saffioti, sociologist and professor from São Paulo;
 Herilda Balduíno de Sousa, lawyer from the Federal District

2003 

 Emília Fernandes, Minister of the Special Secretariat of Policy for Women;
 Raimunda Gomes da Silva,  from Tocantins;
 Nair Jane de Castro Lima, domestic worker in Rio de Janeiro and founder of one of the first workers' associations in her field;
 Nazaré Gadelha, human rights lawyer in Acre;
 Sueli Carneiro, Afro-Brazilian and feminist activist in São Paulo.

2004 

 Eva Sopher, president of the São Pedro Theatre in Porto Alegre;
 Maria Gleyde Martins Costa, of the State Council for the Defense of Women's Rights in Roraima;
 Mônica Maria de Paula Barroso, who works as a public defender in Fortaleza;
 Maria Aparecida Schumaher, of the Movement to Defend Women's Rights, in Rio de Janeiro;
 Zuleika Alambert, feminist, writer, and politician active in Santos, São Paulo

2005 

 Clara Charf, of the National Council for the Rights of Women;
 Maria da Penha Maia Fernandes, pharmacist who fought for the conviction of her husband who tried to kill her, and who inspired the Lei Maria da Penha;
 Palmerinda Donato, journalist;
 Rozeli da Silva, street-sweeper, creator of the do Centro Infantil Renascer da Esperança to support children in need in Porto Alegre;
 Zilda Arns, coordinator of Pastoral da Criança (Pastoral Care for Children)

2006 

 Elizabeth Altino Teixeira, member of the peasant leagues in Paraíba;
 Geraldina Pereira de Oliveira, rural worker from Pará;
 Rosmary Corrêa, lawyer and state deputy from São Paulo;
 Jupyra Barbosa Ghedini, federal civil servant;
 Raimunda Putani, Indigenous pajé healer from Acre

2007 

 Mãe Beata de Iemanjá, ialorixá from Rio de Janeiro;
 Suely Batista dos Santos from Mato Grosso;
 Moema Libera Viezzer (Paraná);
 Maria Yvone Loureiro Ribeiro (Alagoas);
 Ivana Farina Navarrete Pena (Goiás)

2008 

 Alice Editha Klausz;
 Maria dos Prazeres de Souza;
 Jandira Feghali;
 Mayana Zatz;
 Rose Marie Muraro

2009 

 Lily Marinho;
 Sônia Maria Amaral Fernandes Ribeiro;
 Elisa Lucinda Campos Gomes;
 Neide Viana Castanha;
 Cléa Anna Maria Carpi da Rocha;
 Ruth Cardoso (in memoriam)

2010 

 Leci Brandão da Silva;
 Maria Augusta Tibiriçá Miranda;
 Cleuza Pereira do Nascimento;
 Andréa Maciel Pachá;
 Clara Perelberg Steinberg;
 Fani Lerner (in memoriam);
 Maria Lygia de Borges Garcia (special honor)

2011 

 Maria Liège Santos Rocha
 Chloris Casagrande Justen, educator, participant in the State Council of Education of Paraná, and affiliate with the NGO Soroptimista, which aims to provide services to improve the lives of women. Vice president of the Academia Brasileira de Letras' Paraná branch;
 Maria José da Silva, created the Residents Association of Conjunto Bento Ribeiro Dantas in Maré, in Rio de Janeiro, which works on socially inclusive recycling;
 Maria Ruth Barreto Cavalcante, psychopedagogue who studied pedagogy in Cologne, Germany, in the 1960s and was imprisoned by the military for training groups of university students to teach children literacy skills;
 Carmen Helena Ferreira Foro, first woman to become a manager in a trade union center in Brazil, as vice president of the Central Única dos Trabalhadores;
 Ana Maria Pacheco de Vasconcelos (in memoriam)

2012 

 Dilma Rousseff, first woman president of Brazil;
 Maria Prestes, activist and widow of the communist leader Luís Carlos Prestes;
 Eunice Michiles, first woman elected as a senator in the history of Brazil;
 Rosali Scalabrin, representative of the Pastoral Land Commission;
 Ana Alice da Costa, professor associated with the political science department of the Federal University of Bahia, creator of an interdisciplinary postgraduate program on women's studies known as NEIM

2013 

 Jô Moraes, federal deputy;
 Adélia Pessoa, educator;
 Amabília Almeida and Telma Ayres, activists;
 Luzia Santiago, missionary

2014 

 Cristina Buarque, women's secretary of Pernambuco;
 Delaíde Arantes, minister of the Superior Labour Court;
 Magnólia Rocha, president of the Roraima League to Combat Cancer;
 Zezé Rocha, former state deputy of Bahia;
 Maria Lygia Maynard, president of the Associação de Pais e Amigos dos Deficientes Auditivos de Sergipe, an organization for supporters of the hearing impaired

2015 

 Creuza Maria Oliveira
 Cármen Lúcia
 Clara Araújo
 Mary Garcia Castro
 Ivanilda Pinheiro Salucci
 Maria Elizabeth Teixeira Rocha
 Débora Martins Bonafé dos Santos (in memoriam)

2016 
This was the first year the award was given to a man, Marco Aurélio Mello.

 Ellen Gracie Northfleet
 Lucia Regina Antony
 Luiza Helena de Bairros
 Lya Luft
 Marco Aurélio Mello

2017 

 Denice Santiago
 Diza Gonzaga
 Isabel Cristina de Azevedo Heyvaert
 Raimunda Luzia de Brito
 Tatiane Bernardi Teixeira Pinto

2018 
The 26 female deputies who from 1987 and 1988 participated in the process that concluded in the Constitution of Brazil were honored. 

 Abigail Feitosa, in memoriam
 Anna Maria Rattes
 Benedita da Silva
 Bete Mendes
 Beth Azize
 Cristina Tavares, in memoriam
 Dirce Tutu Quadros, in memoriam
 Eunice Michiles
 Irma Passoni
 Lídice da Mata
 Lúcia Braga
 Lúcia Vânia
 Márcia Kubitschek, in memoriam
 Maria de Lourdes Abadia
 Maria Lúcia Melo de Araújo
 Marluce Pinto
 Moema São Thiago
 Myriam Portella
 Raquel Cândido
 Raquel Capiberibe
 Rita Camata
 Rita Furtado, in memoriam
 Rose de Freitas
 Sadie Hauache
 Sandra Cavalcanti
 Wilma de Faria, in memoriam

2019 
There were 23 honorees this year, including judges, artists, artisans, activists, politicians, and professors:

 Alzira Soriano, in memoriam
 Ana Benedita de Serqueira e Silva
 Bibi Ferreira, in memoriam
 Delanira Pereira Gonçalves
 Eudésia Vieira, in memoriam
 Fabiane Maria de Jesus, in memoriam
 Gabriela Manssur
 Helena Heluy
 Helena Meireles, in memoriam
 Heley de Abreu Silva Batista, in memoriam
 Hermínia Maria Silveira Azoury
 Iolanda Ferreira Lima
 Iracy Ribeiro Mangueira Marques
 Jaceguara Dantas da Silva
 Laélia de Alcântara, in memoriam
 Laissa Guerreira
 Leide Moreira, in memoriam
 Leiliane Silva
 Marcia Abrahão Moura
 Margarida Lemos Gonçalves, in memoriam
 Maria Esther Bueno, in memoriam
 Maria Lucia Fattorelli
 Marielle Franco, in memoriam

2022 
In the Diploma Bertha Lutz's 20th anniversary year, after two years of interruption due to the COVID-19 pandemic, the award was given to 21 honorees:

 Ana Lara Camargo de Castro
 Andrea Gadelha
 Angela Salazar
 Eva Evangelista
 Filomena Camilo do Vale
 Flávia Arruda
 Flávia Cintra
 Heloísa Starling
 Ilda Peliz
 Inês Santiago
 Jocilene Barbosa
 Jurema Werneck
 Luiza Trajano
 Margareth Dalcolmo
 Michelle Bolsonaro
 Miracy Barbosa de Souza Gustin
 Mônica Sifuentes
 Renata Gil Alcantara
 Rosa Geane
 Ruth Almeida
 Wilma de Faria, in memoriam

References 

Brazilian awards
Awards honoring women
Awards for contributions to society
Federal Senate